Clinteria klugi is a species of flower chafer found in peninsular India.

References

Cetoniinae